Arbuthnot Leasing International Ltd v Havelet Leasing Ltd (No 2) [1990] BCC 636 is a leading UK insolvency law case, concerning a fraudulent transaction under the Insolvency Act 1986 section 423.

Facts
Arbuthnot sought a declaration that Havelet Leasing Ltd, whose plane and coach hire business had gone insolvent, had defrauded its creditors by transferring its business, assets and contracts to the related Havelet Leasing Finance Ltd. Arbuthnot had financed part of Havelet's business, and it owned some of the vehicles which were leased to Havelet. When Havelet fell into arrears, Arbuthnot obtained a judgment and appointed a receiver. They then found that Havelet had transferred its business, assets and benefits of all Havelet's agreements to a third company (Havelet Leasing Finance Ltd). Havelet's lessees were paying Havelet Leasing Finance, which in turn paid Havelet in quarterly arrears. This was contended to be a fraudulent scheme to elevate the owner of Havelet in priority after insolvency.

Judgment
Scott J held that the transfer would be reversed, that all assets in Havelet Leasing Finance's possession were held on trust for Havelet, without prejudice to Havelet Leasing Finance's creditors. He said that although the motive was not necessarily dishonest (on the basis that Havelet's lawyers had advised Havelet that it was not), the purpose of the transfer was to put the assets out of Arbuthnot's reach, it was still done with the purpose of putting assets beyond creditors' reach and thus was a fraudulent transaction and void.

Scott J's judgment set out as follows.

See also

UK insolvency law
Fraudulent Conveyances Act 1571, repealed by Law of Property Act 1925 s 172, though kept through the insolvency legislation, now Insolvency Act 1986 s 423
Alderson v Temple (1768) 96 ER 384

Notes

References

United Kingdom insolvency case law
High Court of Justice cases
1990 in case law
1990 in British law